The men's singles competition at the 2023 FIL European Luge Championships was held on 14 January 2023.

Results
The first run was held at 13:13 and the second run at 14:35.

References

Men's singles